Luigi Locati (July 23, 1928 – July 14, 2005) was an Italian Catholic missionary and bishop.  He was shot to death at the pastoral center of Isiolo, Kenya. Two priests, Cyril Mukuchia(Cyril was later found innocent and not guilty and was cleared off all the 
accusations and charges) and Peter Malley Guyo Wako, were arrested in connection to his murder.

Biography 
Born in the village Vinzaglio in northern Italy, he was ordained as priest on June 29, 1952. In the 1960s he came to Kenya as a missionary and worked as a parish priest in Isiolo. In Isiolo he knew Annalena Tonelli, an Italian woman who was also a missionary and was killed in Africa in 2003.

References 

Roman Catholic missionaries in Kenya
20th-century Roman Catholic bishops in Kenya
21st-century Roman Catholic bishops in Kenya
1928 births
2005 deaths
Deaths by firearm in Kenya
Italian people murdered abroad
People murdered in Kenya
Italian Roman Catholic missionaries
Italian expatriates in Kenya
Italian Roman Catholic bishops in Africa
Roman Catholic bishops of Isiolo